Allison Cameron, M.D., is a fictional character on the Fox medical drama House, portrayed by American actress Jennifer Morrison. An immunologist, Cameron was a member of Dr. Gregory House's team of handpicked specialists at Princeton-Plainsboro Teaching Hospital's Department of Diagnostic Medicine. She returned for the final episode of the series, "Everybody Dies".

Personality 

At the start of the show, Cameron was the only woman on House's initial diagnostic team. She is known for her honesty, sincerity, idealism and strong ethical center. Even so, she is not out of her depth teasing others, as she does when alone with Chase, telling him that women can have hour-long orgasms (in response to Foreman telling her Chase is interested but shy); but, when Foreman enters, she acts completely deadpan. She is a deist, claiming "I believe in a higher order that's in control of what happens, but not in one anthropomorphic entity called 'God' that's concerned with the everyday workings of you and me", but expresses a feeling of respect for people with religious beliefs, unlike House, who openly and mercilessly taunts religious people. Joyce Millman of The New York Times has stated she plays "Jane Eyre to House's Edward Rochester." Millman stated that House's description of Cameron in "Love Hurts" (see box on the right) " cut to the core of Cameron's motivation and personality". Morrison has said that Cameron hates herself for being in love with House, "but she can't help but find him desirable". Cameron objects to House's reliance on deceiving their patients and has gone head-to-head with him several times on the issue. She has also been reluctant to deliver bad news to patients or their families.

Cameron's interest in House supposedly subsided as she began a relationship with Chase, although it resurfaces occasionally with flirtations and Freudian slips; in the season 4 episode "Ugly", Cameron lets slip to a documentary team that she loves House. In "No More Mr. Nice Guy", when House is believed to have neurosyphillis, Chase asks her directly in front of Foreman and the other fellows if she has slept with House, to which she ambiguously replies "It's none of your business". Chase thinks she did; however, later, when they are in private, she says she did not. In season 4, Cameron also dyes her hair blonde. Early in season 4, House, who was told by Dr. James Wilson (Robert Sean Leonard) and Dr. Lisa Cuddy (Lisa Edelstein) that Cameron and Chase moved to Arizona, finds her in the ER after finally discovering that they were still working at the hospital. House tells her that she was an "idiot". When Cameron asks if it was either the hair or where she was working, he said where she was working, stating that her hair made her look like a hooker and that he liked it.

In the season 5 episode "Big Baby", Cameron temporarily moves up to Acting Dean of Medicine and Hospital Administrator, after Cuddy decides to spend more time being a mother. However, she soon quits, stating that she can never say no to House after studying under him for three years.

In season 6, Cameron left PPTH and divorced Chase after finding out about the events that took place in the episode The Tyrant. Her last episode as a main character was Teamwork, the 8th episode of the season. She left when she realized that House had a heavy impact on Chase and she couldn't live with it, after her failed attempt to make Chase quit the hospital as well.

She later appeared in the season 6 episode, Lockdown, to get Chase to sign their divorce papers and after having done so, the two of them ended on good terms. This was her last appearance in the show until her cameo in the series finale.

Reception 
Maureen Ryan of the Chicago Tribune reported that many fans were disappointed the character received less airtime in season 4.
David Shore and producer Katie Jacobs stated that Chase and Cameron would be getting sufficient screentime and storylines soon throughout the series when many of the show's fans complained and took action.

Departure 
Fox Broadcasting announced in September 2009 that Cameron would be written out of the series in the middle of season 6. This was a decision on the part of the writers and producers, and not Morrison's.

Before her final episode aired on November 16, 2009, Morrison commented on the announcement of her departure, stating that it was not definite. "I don't think anyone really knows...they're always just a couple of episodes ahead, and [executive producer] David Shore has always been very true to the writing of the characters and what he believes them to be." Morrison says that Shore is currently trying to figure out the truth of where Cameron's supposed to be right now, and "if she fits into the hospital...and as far as I know, they don't know. So that's what I know," Morrison said at the Star Trek home video premiere party. Cameron returned in the season 6 episode, Lockdown as well as in the series finale, Everybody Dies, as a hallucination. Cameron was also present at House's funeral, telling everyone that "somewhere... he knew how to love."

References

External links 
 Allison Cameron on TVIV
 Dr. Allison Cameron on House M.D. Guide

House (TV series) characters
Television characters introduced in 2004
Fictional female doctors
Fictional physicians
Fictional methamphetamine users